Daniel Mérillon (29 June 1852 – 23 August 1925) was a French sports shooter. He competed at the 1908 and 1912 Summer Olympics.

Mérillon was the president of the French Shooting Federation and the director-general of the overall sporting program at the Exposition Universelle, which encompassed the 1900 Summer Olympics.

References

1852 births
1925 deaths
French male sport shooters
Olympic shooters of France
Shooters at the 1908 Summer Olympics
Shooters at the 1912 Summer Olympics
Sportspeople from Bordeaux
20th-century French people